OpenUI5 is a JavaScript application framework designed to build cross-platform, responsive, enterprise-ready applications. It is an open-source project maintained by SAP SE available under the Apache 2.0 license and open to contributions.
OpenUI5's core is based on JavaScript, jQuery, and LESS. The library's feature set includes model–view–controller patterns, data binding, its own UI-element library, and internationalisation support.

History 
The team that started the project in 2009, that eventually lead to OpenUI5 was tasked with creating a new  user interface (UI) for SAP applications. Objectives included a framework that was flexible, extensible, modern, and would provide a consistent look and feel across SAP applications. In addition to this, at the time SAP's main UI framework was tightly coupled to its backend technology, becoming a bottleneck to UI improvements.

The library was open sourced in December 2013, after being used in production at SAP for several years. In October 2014, the team started accepting contributions via GitHub.

Commercial status 

All OpenUI5 components are completely free, and there are no paid "premium" or "commercial" widgets:

Main features 

 180 UI controls, grouped in cross-device (running on phones, tablets and desktops) — menu, carousel, panel, toolbar, icon tab bar, layout, responsive grid, splitter, list, table, dialog, message box, message toast, responsive popover, calendar, combo box, date range selection, file uploader, rating indicator, segmented button, slider, tags display, color picker, tree, table, tree table, etc.
 WYSIWYG theme designer (not open sourced)
 MVC architecture
 Different view formats (XML, HTML, JavaScript or JSON)
 Data binding with OData, JSON or XML models
 I18n, including right-to-left language support
 Consistent UX patterns across all frontend features

References

External links 
 OpenUI5 official website

JavaScript libraries